John Furlong (born 28 June 1972) is a New Zealand cricketer. He played in four first-class matches for Central Districts from 1990 to 1994.

See also
 List of Central Districts representative cricketers

References

External links
 

1972 births
Living people
New Zealand cricketers
Central Districts cricketers
Cricketers from Napier, New Zealand